Antonios Papakonstantinou (born 18 March 1999) is a Greek rower. He won a gold medal in the lightweight single sculls at the 2022 European Rowing Championships.

External links

References

1999 births
Living people
Greek male rowers
World Rowing Championships medalists for Greece
European Rowing Championships medalists
21st-century Greek people